Cystostemon is a genus of flowering plants belonging to the family Boraginaceae.

Its native range is Tropical Africa to Arabian Peninsula.

Species:

Cystostemon barbatus 
Cystostemon ethiopicus 
Cystostemon heliocharis 
Cystostemon hispidissimus 
Cystostemon hispidus 
Cystostemon intricatus 
Cystostemon kissenioides 
Cystostemon linearifolius 
Cystostemon loveridgei 
Cystostemon macranthera 
Cystostemon mechowii 
Cystostemon medusa 
Cystostemon mwinilungensis 
Cystostemon socotranus 
Cystostemon somaliensis 
Cystostemon virescens

References

Boraginaceae
Boraginaceae genera